Artur Sargsian is a Russian Greco-Roman wrestler of Armenian descent. He won one of the bronze medals in the 97 kg event at the 2021 World Wrestling Championships held in Oslo, Norway. In his bronze medal match he defeated Nikoloz Kakhelashvili of Italy.

At the 2021 U23 World Wrestling Championships held in Belgrade, Serbia, he won the gold medal in the 97 kg event.

References

External links 
 

Living people
Russian people of Armenian descent
Year of birth missing (living people)
Place of birth missing (living people)
Russian male sport wrestlers
World Wrestling Championships medalists
21st-century Russian people